Oak–hickory forest is a type of North American forest ecosystem, and an ecoregion of the Temperate broadleaf and mixed forests Biome.

Geography
It has a range extending from Rhode Island and southern New York, west to Iowa, and south to Northern Georgia. Smaller, isolated oak–hickory communities can also be found as far west as North Dakota, south in Florida and in northeast Texas, and north to southern Maine and Ontario. They can also be found in Pennsylvania west to Illinois.

Dominated by nut-bearing oak and hickory species of trees, the oak–hickory forest has the largest range of any deciduous forest ecosystem in eastern and central North America.

Natural history
The current oak–hickory forest includes the former range of the oak–chestnut forest region, which encompassed the northeast portion of the current oak–hickory range. When the American chestnut population succumbed to invasive fungal blight in the early 20th century, those forests shifted to an oak and hickory dominated ecosystem.

Biota
Key indicator tree and shrub species of the oak–hickory forest include red oak, black oak, scarlet oak, white oak, Chestnut oak (Quercus prinus), Pignut hickory (Carya glabra), Bitternut hickory (Carya cordiformis), Shagbark hickory (Carya ovata), flowering dogwood (Cornus florida), blueberry, Mountain laurel (Kalmia latifolia), and hawthorn.

Bird and animal species include the gray squirrel, flying squirrel, chipmunk, blue jay, and wild turkey.

References

 Cronin, William. Changes in the Land: Indians, Colonists, and the Ecology of New England. Hill and Wang, New York, 2003.
 Kricher, John. A Field Guide to Eastern Forests. Houghton-Mifflin, Boston, 1998.
 "Percent of Forests in Oak-Hickory Groups, 1992." Map, United States Department of Agriculture, 1992.

Temperate broadleaf and mixed forests in the United States
Ecoregions of the United States
Plant communities of the Eastern United States
Flora of the Eastern United States
Plant communities of Kentucky
Plant communities of North Carolina
Plant communities of Ohio
Plant communities of Pennsylvania
Plant communities of South Carolina
Plant communities of Tennessee
Plant communities of Virginia
Plant communities of West Virginia
Ecology of the Appalachian Mountains
Flora of the Northeastern United States
Flora of the Southeastern United States
Flora of Eastern Canada
Flora of the Appalachian Mountains
Flora of Ontario
Forest ecology